Munruben is a rural locality in the City of Logan, Queensland, Australia. Once a rural community, it has been developed into a low density residential community.

Geography 
The Mount Lindesay Highway (formerly the New England Highway) passes through the suburb. The area known as Jerry's Downfall is notorious for bogging and flooding.

History 
The locality was officially named in 1991 (when it was in the Shire of Beaudesert). 

On 6 July 1882, Norris's daughter Emma Evans and three of her children (Richard William, Ruth and Edward) drowned in the Logan River while crossing the river in a dinghy which was in poor condition. There is a memorial for the family in Gieseman Park.

Formerly in the Shire of Beaudesert, Munruben became part of Logan City following the local government amalgamations in March 2008.

The median age of the Munruben population was 38 years, 1 year above the national median of 37. 77.6% of people living in Munruben were born in Australia. The other top responses for country of birth were England 5.8%, New Zealand 5%, Germany 1%, Scotland 0.7%, South Africa 0.7%. 91.1% of people spoke only English at home; the next most common languages were 0.8% German, 0.7% Hmong, 0.5% Hindi, 0.5% Serbian, 0.4% Vietnamese.

Education 
There are no schools in Munruben. The nearest government primary school is Park Ridge State School in Park Ridge to the north. The nearest government secondary school is Park Ridge State High School, also in Park Ridge.

Amenities
Riverwood Ministries Church of Christ is at 1756 Chambers Flat Road.

There are a number of parks in the area:
 Chambers Flat Road Park
 Giesemann Park

 Jerrys Downfall Reserve

 Norris Creek Park

Jerry's Downfall Reserve is located in the north-east of Munruben. The name commemorates an early teamster who had an accident there. The name Jerry's Downfall has been in use since at least 1866. It has been suggested that he was a Kanaka from Robert Towns' cotton plantation at Townvale, who capsized a bullock dray of cotton while crossing Chambers Creek. It has also been suggested that the incident is connected to the Keaveny family. The Beaudesert Historical Society have erected a plaque at the reserve.

References

External links

 
 

1991 establishments in Australia
Populated places established in 1991
Localities in Queensland